The Journal of Electronic Imaging is a peer-reviewed scientific journal published quarterly by SPIE and the Society for Imaging Science and Technology. It covers all technology topics pertaining to the field of electronic imaging. The editor-in-chief is Zeev Zalevsky.

Abstracting and indexing
This journal is indexed by the following services:
 Science Citation Index Expanded
 Current Contents/Engineering, Computing & Technology
 Inspec
 Scopus
 Ei/Compendex
 Astrophysics Data System
According to the Journal Citation Reports, the journal has a 2020 impact factor of 0.945.

References

External links
 

English-language journals
Publications established in 1992
Optics journals
SPIE academic journals
Electrical and electronic engineering journals
Quarterly journals